Nenad Filipović (Serbian Cyrillic: Ненад Филиповић; born 5 October 1978) is a Serbian racewalker. He competed in the 50 km event at the 2008, 2012 and 2016 Olympics with the best result of 30th place in 2008. His twin brother Predrag is also an Olympic racewalker.

References

External links

 
 
 
 
  (archive)

Sportspeople from Leskovac
Serbian male racewalkers
1978 births
Living people
Athletes (track and field) at the 2008 Summer Olympics
Athletes (track and field) at the 2012 Summer Olympics
Athletes (track and field) at the 2016 Summer Olympics
Olympic athletes of Serbia
21st-century Serbian people